Carlos Manga (6 January 1928 – 17 September 2015) was a Brazilian film director. He directed 25 films between 1952 and 1986.

Selected filmography
 The Terrible Twosome (1953)
 Os Trapalhões e o Rei do Futebol (1986)

References

External links

1928 births
2015 deaths
Brazilian film directors
Brazilian screenwriters
Writers from Rio de Janeiro (city)